Maubec may refer to several communes in France:

 Maubec, Isère
 Maubec, Tarn-et-Garonne
 Maubec, Vaucluse